Johannes Hertel (13 March 1872, Zwickau – 27 October 1955, Leipzig) was a German Indologist.

Hertel wrote numerous essays and books on Indological topics. His research focus was Indian narrative literature and the Vedas. Above all, he is known for his scientific work on the textual history of the Panchatantra.

Hertel obtained his Ph.D. from the University of Leipzig in 1897 with a thesis on the Hitopadesha. From 1919 to 1937 he was full professor and Chair of Indian Studies at the University of Leipzig, where he taught Asian and Indo-European languages such as Sanskrit, Vedic, and Avestan, and he translated numerous works from these into German. Most of his works on Vedic and Avestan subjects appeared in the series Indo-Iranische Quellen und Forschungen ("Indo-Iranian Sources and Research"), which he also edited.

In November 1933 Hertel signed the Vow of allegiance of the Professors of the German Universities and High-Schools to Adolf Hitler and the National Socialistic State.

Hertel was a member of the Saxonian Academy of Sciences and the Royal Asiatic Society in London.

Hertel's extensive correspondence is located in the University Archives of Leipzig and in the manuscript department of the Leipzig University Library.

Publications

Notes

External links 
 Article at Encyclopædia Iranica

Translators from Sanskrit
German translators
German Indologists
German Sanskrit scholars
Leipzig University alumni
1872 births
1955 deaths